Léon Chené (16 December 1905 – 16 December 1992) was a French racing cyclist. He rode in the 1929 Tour de France.

References

1905 births
1992 deaths
French male cyclists
Place of birth missing